Karl Lindblom (7 June 1892 – 10 January 1969) was a Swedish track and field athlete who competed in the 1912 Summer Olympics. In 1912 he was eliminated in the first round of the 200 metres competition.

References

External links
Profile

1892 births
1969 deaths
Swedish male sprinters
Olympic athletes of Sweden
Athletes (track and field) at the 1912 Summer Olympics
20th-century Swedish people